Karen Heuler (born June 13, 1949) is an American writer of literary, dark fantasy, science fiction, and horror short stories, and novels.

Biography 
Heuler was born in Brooklyn, New York and attended Long Island University, where she got her Master's in English in 1976.  She worked in various jobs in and out of publishing, including in crosswords, art books, on Wall Street and in retail. She currently teaches occasionally for New York University School of Professional Studies, and others. She's had over 100 stories published in literary and speculative journals and anthologies, plus four novels, three collections, and one novella. Her work focuses most on the perception of reality and very frequently features doubles and doppelgangers, from both a literary and speculative point of view. She frequently uses literary works as a reference point for speculative stories, as an indicator of the continuity of topics across genres.

Work

Books 
 In Search of Lost Time, Aqueduct Press, 2017
 Other Places, Aqueduct Press, Oct. 2016 
 Glorious Plague, Permuted Press, April 2014
 The Inner City, ChiZine Publications, Canada, 2013
 The Made-up Man, Livingston Press, Livingston, Alabama, May  2011
 Journey to Bom Goody, Livingston Press, Livingston, Alabama, May  2005
 The Soft Room, Livingston Press, Livingston, Alabama, May  2004
 The Other Door, University of Missouri Press, Columbia, Missouri, October 1995

Anthologies 
Tiny Crimes, Black Balloon Publishing, 2019
Killing It Softly 2, Digital Fiction Publishing, Fall 2017
Invaders, Tachyon Publications, 2016
Dreams from the Witch House, Dark Regions Press, 2016
The Bestiary, Cheeky Frawg Books, 2016
Mosaics, DayDreams Dandelions Press, 2016
Black Apples, Belladonna Publishing, 2014
Not Just Rockets and Robots: Daily Science Fiction Year One, 2012
Year’s Best SF 17, Harper Voyager, 2012
Realms 2: the Second Year of Clarkesworld, Prime Books, 2010
Best of the Web, Dzanc Books, 2009
The Year’s Best Science Fiction and Fantasy, Prime Books, 2009
Phantom, Prime Books, 2009
Bandersnatch, Prime Books, 2007
ParaSpheres,  Omnidawn Publishing, 2006
Snakes: An Anthology,  M. Evans and Co, 2003 
Prize Stories The Best of 1998: The O. Henry Awards, Anchor Books, 1998

Short stories 

 Among the Missing, Saturday Evening Post online, May 11, 2018
 Heading for the Border, Shoreline of Infinity, March 2018
 The Dream Catcher, TJ Eckleburg Review, Sept 2017
 Here and There, Conjunctions, Spring 2017
 The Reordering of Tonia Vivian, Aliterate Journal, May 2017
 That Place, Maine Review, Winter 2017
 What Approaches, Digital Fiction Horror, Nov. 2016 (reprint)
 Goodness in All Its Forms, Saturday Evening Post online, Aug. 5, 2016
 The Smallest Possible Ships, SciPhi Journal, June 2016
 After They’ve Gone, Strangelet, June 2016
 The Rising Up, See the Elephant, Issue 2, 2016
 The Very Difficult Job, Tin House Flash Fridays, Jan. 2016
 Egg Island, Clarkesworld, Oct. 2015
 Bright Bright Bedlam, Kenyon Review Online, Aug. 5, 2015
 The Lovely Kisselthwist, Saturday Evening Post Online, March 20, 2015
 The Alien Came Over the Hill, Daily Science Fiction, July 13, 2015
 The Terrible Journey, Michigan Quarterly Review, Winter 2015
 The Mechanical Nature of Love, BuzzyMag, Dec. 4, 2014
 The Stray Curse, Indiana Review, Summer 2014
 Space Mama, Daily Science Fiction, Oct. 8, 2013
 How to Be a Foreigner, Perihelion, Sept. 12, 2013 
 What Approaches, Penumbra magazine, fall 2012 
 The Clockworm, Journal of Unlikely Entomology, fall 2012
 Thick Water, Albedo One magazine, Spring 2011 
 The Large People, Daily Science Fiction, July 2011
 The Hair, Michigan Quarterly Review, Spring 2011
 Searching for Penny, American Literary Review, Spring 2011
 Fish Wish, Weird Tales Magazine, Winter 2011
 Elvis in Bloom, Lady Churchill's Rosebud Wristlet, Summer 2011
 Beds, Moon Milk Review, Feb. 2010
 Mice, Vestal Review, Winter 2010
 The Great Spin, Confrontation, winter 2010
 Exile, Fantasy magazine, April 19, 2010 (online)
 The Great Spin, Wet Ink magazine, September 2009
 Silver Watches Everything, StoryQuarterly magazine, Issue 43
 Joey, the Upstairs Boy, Alaska Quarterly Review, 2009
 Oh He Is, Fantasy magazine, May 18, 2009
 The Completely Rechargeable Man, Clarkesworld, Dec. 2008
 Ball Lightning, Oxmag (online), 2008
 The Difficulties of Evolution, Weird Tales, June/July 2008
 The House of Gold, Odyssey magazine, March 2008
 Landscape, with Fish, Weird Tales, Feb. 2008
 The Inner City, Cemetery Dance, Feb. 2008
 Right Ida, The St. Ann's Review, winter 2007/08
 Shady Guy, Shenandoah, winter 2007/08
 Games, Crab Creek Review, Fall 2007
 Talking about Rita, The Pedestal Magazine, May/June 2007 (online)
 Guest Appearance, Crab Orchard Review, Fall 2005
 The Log, Arts & Letters, Fall 2005 
 Ooh, North Dakota Quarterly, Summer 2005 
 Road Work, Phoebe, vol 33 no. 2, fall 2004 
 The Naked Man, Clackamas Review, 2004, vol. 8
 Primo Chemo, Serpentinia, 2002 awards issue (online)
 Cookies, Night Train Magazine, vol. II, Summer 2003
 Fool Radiance, Literary Review, Fall 2002
 Metropolitan Pigeon, The Bear Deluxe, Number 19, Summer/Fall 2002
 Slyboy! Sneakerheart!, Literal Latte, Volume 8 Number 1, Summer  2002
 Ordinary, Confrontation, No. 78/79. Spring/Summer 2002
 Chemo Dreams, Sycamore Review, West Lafayette, IN, Summer 2000
 The Snakes of Central Park, Mid American Review,  Bowling Green, OH, Spring/summer 2000
 Satan In All His Glory, Michigan Quarterly Review, Ann Arbor, MI, Spring/summer 2000
 Graced, Confrontation,  Brookville, NY, Summer 1999
 The Right Chemistry, New York Stories, Long Island City, NY, Winter/spring 1999
 At the Edge of the River, Alaska Quarterly Review, Anchorage, Alaska, Summer/Fall 1998
 Me and My Enemy, Virginia Quarterly Review, Charlottesville, VA, Autumn 1997, Vol. 73 No. 4
 The Escape Artist, International Quarterly, Tallahassee, FL, 1997, Vol. 3 No. 1
 And the Snake, So Sinuous, Witness, Farmington Hills, MI, Vol. XI, No. 1 1997
 The Hole Story, Beloit Fiction magazine, Beloit, WI, Summer 1995
 Sick Leave, Alaska Quarterly Review, Anchorage, Alaska, Summer/Fall 1995
 Overpowering Joy, Ms. Magazine, New York, NY, March/April 1995
 The Revolt of Everyday Things, Massachusetts Review, Amherst, MA, Summer 1993
 How Lightly He Stepped in the Air, Short Fiction by Women, New York, NY, Issue 4
 Like a Piston, like a Flame, Crosscurrents, Westlake Village, CA, Winter 91/92
 Figaro, Figueroa, The Boston Review, Boston, MA, Jan./Feb. 1991
 Simple Accommodations, New Virginia Review, Richmond, VA, Winter 1990/91
 Ghost Nets, TriQuarterly 77, Evanston, IL, Winter 1989/90
 The Lizard Woman, Kansas Quarterly, Manhattan, KS, Vol. 19, No. 3, Summer 1987
 The Sieve, Clifton Magazine, Cincinnati, OH, Winter 1987
 In A Perfect World, Carolina Quarterly, Chapel Hill, NC, Spring 1986, Vol. 38, No. 3

Awards and honorable mentions 
 2010 Literary Prize in Fiction, American Literary Review
 1998 O. Henry award
 Finalist, The Shirley Jackson Awards, 2009 & 2017
 Finalist, Bellwether Prize for Fiction, 2004
 Second place, Night Train Magazine's 50/50 awards, 2003
 Finalist, 1993 Iowa Short Fiction Awards 
 Semifinalist, 1992 Nelson Algren Award

References

External links
 Official website

1949 births
American horror novelists
Living people
21st-century American novelists
American women novelists
American fantasy writers
American science fiction writers
21st-century American short story writers
Long Island University alumni
21st-century American women writers